Shanghai United International School (上海协和双语学校) is a group of international schools in Shanghai, China. There are 7 campuses located in Shanghai till 2022, Jiaoke Campus, Hongqiao Campus, Shangyin Campus, Gubei Campus, Pudong Campus, Wanyuan Campus, and Qingpu Campus. Currently, these four schools have approximately 1,500 students.

Academics are based on the International Curriculum of England (ICE) and the IB Primary Years Programme (PYP), while local Chinese academics are also available at local stream. Besides these two main curriculums, the school also provides other international curriculums like the BC (British Columbia) program which is a Canadian program. 

Shanghai United International School has also opened a campus in Wenzhou, Xiamen  and Wuxi.

References

External links

International schools in Shanghai
International Baccalaureate schools in China